USCGC Cypress (WLB-210) is a United States Coast Guard cutter and the tenth Juniper-class seagoing buoy tender.  She is outfitted with advanced technological and navigational capabilities that allow her to be positioned correctly for exact placement of buoys through the use of controllable-pitch propellers and stern and bow thrusters.

Etymology
The first  was one of eight Manzanita-class buoy tenders constructed for the U.S. Lighthouse Service.  The ship was commissioned on 21 July 1908, decommissioned 20 August 1946 and sold on 18 March 1947.

History

2000s
The advances made from the  vintage seagoing buoytenders to the current Juniper-class are all-encompassing. Cypress is also designed to skim and recover oil in the event of an oil spill. Cypress's Integrated Ship Control System has an Electronic Charting Display and Information System (ECDIS) which enables the fixing of her position to within five meters every second. Her Dynamic Positioning System (DPS) uses this positioning information, the ship's controllable-pitch propeller, and the stern and bow thrusters to keep the ship on station without any human input. Cypress's Machinery Plant Control and Monitoring System (MPCMS) has over 1000 sensors throughout the ship. This system makes it possible for one person in the engine room control center to monitor the ship's plant while underway.

Cypress''' main area of operation stretches along  of the Gulf Coast, from Apalachicola, Florida to the Mexican border at Brownsville, Texas, where she is responsible for the maintenance of 120 floating aids-to-navigation.

In 2005, Cypress contributed to the re-build and extension of the Houston Ship Channel entrance, the portal to the busy Houston-Galveston area and used by more than 6,000 large vessels annually. In spring 2007, Cypress completed her first extended Alien Migration Interdiction Operations (AMIO) patrol for Coast Guard District Seven. During this patrol, she intercepted two go-fast smuggler vessels and seven suspected smugglers, as well as processing over 75 illegal migrants. In addition to routine and emergency servicing of approximately 120 federal aids-to- navigation, Cypress also assists the National Oceanic and Atmospheric Administration (NOAA) and the National Data Buoy Center (NDBC) by servicing approximately twenty weather buoys throughout the Gulf of Mexico, critical to assisting professional mariners with voyage planning as well as tracking and predicting hurricanes. Cypress has also operated in support of her secondary missions, engaging in Maritime Law Enforcement patrols and conducting search and rescue (SAR). In one recent SAR case, Cypress rescued 8 people from their recreational boat just minutes before it sank.

2010sCypress responded to the Deepwater Horizon oil spill impacting the Gulf of Mexico, conducting oil recovery operations and support of the operational commander’s goals.

From April to May 2012 Cypress underwent a drydock period at Tampa Shipbuilding Company. In 2012 and 2013, USCGC Cypress was a recipient of the Forrest O. Rednour Award for Medium Afloat "Galley of the Year."

In March 2019, USCGC Cypress'' collided with the Algiers Ferry dock at Woldenberg Park in New Orlean's French Quarter. The ship was carrying the Zulu king and queen to Lundi Gras festivities.  Officials said that the ship's onboard computer system failed and propulsion kicked in, speeding her up and into the dock.  Though the bow sustained damage, there were no reported injuries.

References

External links

Ships of the United States Coast Guard
Juniper-class seagoing buoy tenders
2001 ships
Ships built by Marinette Marine